Playhouse Disney Morning (Now Disney Junior Morning) is a television block that airs on Disney Channel Middle East from 3a.m. till 6:45a.m. GMT (6a.m. till 9:45a.m. KSA) but in summer from 3a.m. till 5:50a.m. GMT  (6a.m. till 8:50a.m. KSA)in English, Arabic, and Swedish.

Programming
 Handy Manny
 Jungle Junction
 Imagination Movers
 Doc McStuffins'
 Mickey Mouse Clubhouse Little Einsteins Higglytown Heroes Special Agent Oso Jake and the Never Land Pirates Art Attack''

See also
 Disney Channel Middle East

External links
 Official Site
 Disney Channel Middle East Official Site

Disney Channel original programming